Coal Hill is a city in Johnson County, Arkansas, United States. The population was 1,012 at the 2010 census.

History
Coal mining gave the town its name.

Geography
Coal Hill is located in southwestern Johnson County at  (35.436998, -93.672307). U.S. Highway 64 passes through the center of town, leading east  to Clarksville, the county seat, and west  to Ozark. Arkansas Highway 164 runs north from the east end of Coal Hill  to Interstate 40 at Exit 47.

Demographics

2020 census

As of the 2020 United States census, there were 820 people, 430 households, and 305 families residing in the city.

2000 census
As of the census of 2000, there were 1,001 people, 411 households, and 274 families residing in the city. The racial makeup of the city was 95.50% White, 0.40% Native American, 1.90% from other races, and 2.20% from two or more races.  2.70% of the population were Hispanic or Latino of any race.

There were 411 households, out of which 29.4% had children under the age of 18 living with them, 49.6% were married couples living together, 12.7% had a female householder with no husband present, and 33.3% were non-families. 29.9% of all households were made up of individuals, and 14.6% had someone living alone who was 65 years of age or older.  The average household size was 2.44 and the average family size was 2.99.

In the city, the population was spread out, with 24.6% under the age of 18, 9.7% from 18 to 24, 28.0% from 25 to 44, 21.6% from 45 to 64, and 16.2% who were 65 years of age or older.  The median age was 36 years. For every 100 females, there were 95.5 males.  For every 100 females age 18 and over, there were 92.1 males.

The median income for a household in the city was $23,490, and the median income for a family was $34,250. Males had a median income of $23,077 versus $16,544 for females. The per capita income for the city was $13,540.  About 16.6% of families and 21.1% of the population were below the poverty line, including 23.5% of those under age 18 and 22.9% of those age 65 or over.

Notable people
Marshall Chrisman, businessman and politician, born in Coal Hill in 1933
Boss Schmidt, born in Coal Hill, major league baseball player

References

Cities in Johnson County, Arkansas